Hemsley is a surname. Notable people with the surname include:

 Alfred Hemsley (1860–1937), politician
 Colin Hemsley (born 1949), cricketer
 Estelle Hemsley (1887–1968), actress
 Gilbert Vaughn Hemsley Jr. (1936–1983), lighting designer 
 Harry Hemsley (1877–1951), music hall and radio comedian
 Hemsley Fraser, consultancy firm
 Hemsley Winfield (1907–1934), dancer
 James Hemsley (born 1941), British entrepreneur
 Jasmine and Melissa Hemsley (born 1980 and 1985), English food writers
 John Hemsley (born 1935), British Army officer, writer and rally driver
 Kerry Hemsley (born 1960), rugby league footballer 
 Margaret Hemsley (born 1971), Australian racing cyclist
 Nate Hemsley (born 1974), American football linebacker
 Oliver Hemsley (born 1962), businessman and entrepreneur
 Rollie Hemsley (1907–1972), baseball catcher 
 Sherman Hemsley (1938–2012), actor
 Stephen J. Hemsley (born 1952), manager
 Ted Hemsley (born 1943), footballer and cricketer
 Thomas Hemsley (1927–2013), English musician
 William Hemsley (Maryland politician) (1737–1812), planter and U.S. Representative from Maryland
 William Hemsley (botanist) (1843–1924), botanist
 William Hemsley (painter) (1817 or 1819 – 1906), genre painter

See also
 Helmsley (disambiguation)
 Styrax hemsleyanus, aka Hemsley snowball